Ranges for fictitious telephone numbers are common in most telephone numbering plans. One of the main reasons these ranges exist is to avoid accidentally using real phone numbers in movies and television programs because of viewers frequently calling the numbers used. In North America, the area served by the North American Numbering Plan (NANPA) system of area codes, fictitious telephone numbers are usually of the form (XXX) 555-xxxx. The use of 555 numbers in fiction, however, led a desire to assign some of them in the real world, and some of them are no longer suitable for use in fiction. Other areas have different fictitious telephone numbers.

To be effective, it must not be possible to change a fictitious telephone number into a real one by adding or changing a few digits. Usually, the number must be unassigned in every area code within the numbering plan. Outside NANPA, special fictitious telephone numbers for mobile phones, premium-rate numbers or toll free numbers are sometimes assigned as well.

Telephone numbers in movies, television and music
In the I Love Lucy episode "The Girls Want to Go to a Nightclub" (1951), Lucy dials up Sam Zabaglione, at Plaza 52099 (755-2099).

In 1963, Hawkshaw Hawkins recorded "Lonesome 7-7203", which would properly appear in a directory as LOnesome 7-7203.

In 1966, Wilson Pickett recorded "634-5789 (Soulsville, U.S.A.)", which also appears in the soundtrack of the movie Blues Brothers 2000. It has been covered by multiple artists including Tina Turner and Ry Cooder.

In the January 9, 1976 episode of Sanford and Son "Can You Chop This", Fred Sanford was promoting Whopper Choppers and asked callers to call the number 555-0179 in both the English and Spanish languages.

Tommy Tutone's hit 1982 song "867-5309/Jenny" identifies a working number in many area codes which continue to receive large numbers of calls asking for "Jenny" decades later.

In the 1992 film Sneakers, the NSA agent Mary gives her telephone number as (415) 273-9164.

In 1992, filmmaker Michael Moore unwittingly included footage of himself reciting his telephone number in the documentary Pets or Meat: The Return to Flint.  He received 314 phone calls in just the first day following its broadcast on PBS.

The all-girl singing group The Marvelettes had an early Motown hit record in 1962 with "Beechwood 4-5789", written by Marvin Gaye, William "Mickey" Stevenson and George Gordy. The song became a hit again two decades later when it was covered by The Carpenters in 1982.

The makers of 2003 film Bruce Almighty used 776-2323 as a telephone number for God (played by Morgan Freeman). This number remains unassigned in 1 (716) Buffalo (where the film is set). 776 is not a fictitious exchange in other area codes, where subscribers with the matching number were inundated with callers asking for "God".  In Colorado the calls were misdirected to KDMN radio; in Sanford, North Carolina the number belongs to a church. 776-2323 was ultimately replaced with a 555 number for television airings of the movie and on most copies of the DVD.

"777-9311" by The Time used Dez Dickerson's actual telephone number at the time the song was written, causing his phone to ring incessantly until he had his number changed.

In Germany, the 1981 Spider Murphy Gang song "Skandal im Sperrbezirk" ("Scandal in the Blocked Zone") contains a telephone number, zweiunddreißig, sechzehn, acht: 32 16 8. The number is that of a Munich prostitute who operates in the "blocked zone", the area of the city center where street prostitutes were forbidden. The band checked that the phone number was not assigned in Munich, but it was assigned in some other cities. The song was a hit, topping the charts in Germany for 36 weeks; it was #1 in Austria (16 weeks) and Switzerland (11 weeks) as well. It has become an Oktoberfest staple. Singer Günther Sigl said in an interview that the song became "at one time, the most famous phone number in Germany." He added: "As an apology, we paid for some number changes and sent numerous bouquets."

In 2004, the episode "My Malpractical Decision" of Scrubs gave the character Dr. Turk's phone number as (916) CALL-TUR[K], i.e. (916) 225-5887, with an extraneous 5 at the end to make Turk's full name. (J.D. comments, "I'll always dial the 'K' for you.") This was for a time an active cell phone number, which would play a message urging fans to keep watching the show and to vote for it at the People's Choice Awards. Occasionally it was answered on-set by cast or crew.

In 1994, the singer Anjan Dutt released his debut album Shunte Ki Chao? featuring a Bengali song named 2441139. In the song, Dutt calls his girlfriend Bela Bose at that number, repeating it multiple times in the song's chorus. Dutt says he picked the number because it rhymed well, not realizing that it was an actual residential number of the editor of a local newspaper, the Dainik Vishwamitra. The editor was inundated with calls, become a minor pop sensation himself, and sued Dutt but lost in court.

In 1997, Brazilian singer and rapper Gabriel o Pensador released the single "2345meia78" from his album Quebra-Cabeça. The song tells the story of a man who decides to call all the women in his phonebook from a public phone. The song was in 11th place among the best Brazilian songs of 1997. Since the release of the song, several owners of the number 234-5678, mentioned in the chorus of the song, have frequently received several prank calls. The label Sony Music has offered to buy the phone lines for the number.

In the episode of Frasier titled "The Placeholder" which aired October 14, 2003, Roz left a voicemail that said "Frasier, this is Roz. Write down this number: 555-0179. Don't get mad, that's Ann's number. I talked to her, and she really thought you were cute and sweet and-"

In 2010, in the movie High School, Psyco Ed's card the number (310) 874-9015 presented as a pager number, but the number is the contact phone number of the director of that movie.

By country

Australia

Per the Australian Communications and Media Authority:
Premium rate number
1900 654 321
Geographic numbers
Central East (covering NSW and ACT): (02) 5550 xxxx and (02) 7010 xxxx
South East (covering VIC and TAS): (03) 5550 xxxx and (03) 7010 xxxx
North East (covering QLD): (07) 5550 xxxx and (07) 7010 xxxx
Central West (covering SA, WA and NT): (08) 5550 xxxx and (08) 7010 xxxx
Mobile numbers
0491 570 006, 0491 570 156, 0491 570 157, 0491 570 158 
0491 570 159, 0491 570 110, 0491 570 313, 0491 570 737 
0491 571 266, 0491 571 491, 0491 571 804, 0491 572 549 
0491 572 665, 0491 572 983, 0491 573 770, 0491 573 087 
0491 574 118, 0491 574 632, 0491 575 254, 0491 575 789 
0491 576 398, 0491 576 801, 0491 577 426, 0491 577 644 
0491 578 957, 0491 578 148, 0491 578 888, 0491 579 212 
0491 579 760, 0491 579 455, 
Freephone and local rate numbers
1800 160 401, 1800 975 707, 1800 975 708, 1800 975 709 
1800 975 710, 1800 975 711, 1300 975 707, 1300 975 708 
1300 975 709, 1300 975 710, 1300 975 711

France
The French telephone numbering plan is established by the Autorité de Régulation des Communications Électroniques, des Postes et de la Distribution de la Presse (ARCEP). It reserves six blocks of 10,000 phone numbers for use in audiovisual productions.
 +33 1 99 00 xx xx (geographic, Île-de-France)
 +33 2 61 91 xx xx (geographic, North-west, Réunion, Mayotte)
 +33 3 53 01 xx xx (geographic, North-east)
 +33 4 65 71 xx xx (geographic, South-east)
 +33 5 36 49 xx xx (geographic, South-west, Overseas)
 +33 6 39 98 xx xx (mobile)

Germany

The Federal Network Agency, the primary authority of the telephone numbering plan in Germany, marked off a 1,000-number block of landline numbers in each of five major cities as so-called “Drama Numbers”, to be used in media productions. Additionally, certain mobile providers have also marked off a range of mobile numbers for that purpose.

Hungary

In Hungary, telephone numbers are in the format 06 + area code + subscriber number, where the area code is a single digit 1 for Budapest, the capital, followed by a seven digit subscriber number, and two digits followed by either seven (for cell phone numbers) or six digits (others). for other areas, cell phone numbers or non-geographic numbers like toll-free or premium-rate numbers. Two digit area codes which consist of digits between 2 and 9 are geographic areas, while area codes ending with a 0 or a 1 denote other services. The area code 55, which, according to its first digit, would be normally assigned to a geographic area in Eastern Hungary, is reserved as a test code with no subscriber numbers assigned. There are certain closed networks redefining area code 55 and assigning such numbers for subscribers or machines inside the network, but these are non-standard and non-dialable from outside the network.

Telephone numbers starting with the digits 555 are assigned to subscribers as ordinary numbers. Hungarian taxi company Tele5 Taxi uses 555-5555 as a vanity number, while at least one company specializing in vanity numbers sells cell phone numbers starting with the digits 555 for a premium rate, capitalizing on their fame in American movies.

Republic of Ireland

The following ranges are reserved by the Commission for Communications Regulation (ComReg) for filming and drama use.

 Geographic - 020 91x xxxx 
 Mobile - 089 011 0xxx

North American Numbering Plan

The exchange prefix 555 in the North American Numbering Plan is reserved for Directory Assistance and information numbers. As these are not issued as standard business or residence lines, the use of a 555 number in fiction is almost universal. Only the 555-01xx range is officially reserved, though numbers outside this range are commonly used. Nevada uses 555 phone numbers for TTY (teletypewriter) or TDD (telecommunication device for the deaf) only lines. The state's Public Utilities Commission also uses the prefix for one of its customer service lines.

The reservation applies to all geographic North American Numbering Plan area codes. 555 or a variant remains potentially valid outside North America; New Zealand uses mobile *555 to report traffic collisions.

In North America, exchanges 958 and 959 are normally reserved for local and long-distance test numbers (such as automatic number announcement circuits). A rare few areas (such as area code 204 in Manitoba) reserve 959 only. 950-xxxx are reserved as local access numbers for feature group "B" alternate long-distance carriers. Local or adjacent domestic area codes are mostly avoided as exchange prefixes (so +1 (212) 718-1234 in New York City could only be fictional). These are not as well known and do not often appear in fiction. These reservations do not apply outside North America.

Early Bell System publications which needed to illustrate a telephone with a number displayed on it commonly used (311) 555-2368, and for multi-button phones, -2369, -2370, -2371, etc. This number appeared in Bell advertisements as recently as 1978. These numbers were also common in films and television; Jim Rockford's phone number in the United States detective television series The Rockford Files was (311) 555-2368, as was one of Jaime Sommers' private numbers in The Bionic Woman; as a seven-digit call, 555-2368 reaches Ghostbusters. The number (if dialed as a ten-digit local call in large cities) now reaches 3-1-1 (city hall), but it occasionally continues to appear in documentation as a fictional number.

In much of the North American Numbering Plan, a 0 or 1 in the second digit signified an area code until 1994; these numbers could not be issued as individual local exchanges without breaking eight-digit (1+7D) long-distance calls within an area code. The B-52's (album) used the non-working number 6060-842 as the title of a 45 rpm "B"-side track on the 1979 version of hit single "Rock Lobster"; the song's main character dials "(the) stupid number all day long" only to find it disconnected. This reservation no longer exists.

Universal Pictures acquired the phone number (212) 664-7665 for use in films to avoid the 555 prefix. It has been used in the films Munich, Scott Pilgrim vs. the World, The Adjustment Bureau, and Definitely, Maybe. Fictional Telecom has reserved voice over IP numbers in the 206 (Seattle), 323 (Los Angeles), 415 (San Francisco), and 646 (New York) area codes for use in films, TV and radio dramas. Occasionally, a real number serves as an Easter egg, as the publisher directs a number they own to a promotional message, a contest line or other content which ties into the original programme.

Phone numbers whose exchanges begin with 1 are also occasionally used as fictional numbers. Under the North American Numbering Plan, all telephone exchanges run from 200 to 999 with similar restrictions on telephone area codes. Like the reservation on area codes with "9" as the middle area code digit, the restrictions on "0" and "1" are intended to facilitate a possible future expansion which would lengthen all North American numbers by one or more digits.

South Korea 
In South Korea, the Korean Film Council, since 2011, reserves six number blocks for film and television productions.
 02-540-xxxx (Seoul)
 02-2285-xxxx (Seoul)
 031-521-xxxx (Gyeonggi-do)
 051-746-xxxx (Busan)
 010-3348-xxxx (mobile)
 010-6687-xxxx (mobile)

Sweden
The Swedish Post and Telecom Authority (PTS) handles the Swedish telephone numbering plan. PTS has decided to reserve five number series (one for mobile numbers, the other four for landline numbers) for use in, for example, films, TV series or books:

United Kingdom

The Office of Communications (Ofcom) has reserved blocks of numbers in most major areas for use in TV and radio dramas. Fictitious numbers in (011x) and (01x1) area codes mostly end with the digits 496 0xxx, however Tyneside uses (0191) 498 0xxx. London uses 020 7946 0xxx; Cardiff uses 029 2018 0xxx; and Northern Ireland now uses 028 9649 6xxx after a previously reserved range was allocated for actual use. The generic (and currently unused) area code 01632 is available for all other purposes. Ofcom also reserves blocks of mobile phone (07700 900xxx), freephone (0808 157 0xxx), and premium rate (0909 879 0xxx) numbers for drama use. They also recently added a UK-wide range to the list (0306 999 0xxx).

See also
555 (telephone number)
Fictitious domain name
Fictitious Internet resource
example.com
PEnnsylvania 6-5000 – the Hotel Pennsylvania's number, popularized in Glenn Miller song Pennsylvania 6-5000
"Beechwood 4-5789" – a song by the Marvelettes
Candy Matson – a radio program (1949–1950) that gave Matson's number as YUkon 2-8409

References

Telephone numbers